The 1926–27 Sussex County Football League season was the seventh in the history of the competition.

League table
The league featured 12 clubs, 11 which competed in the last season, along with one new club:
 Horsham

League table

References

1926-27
9